Edward S. Johnston is an American multimedia artist and designer creating works involving interactive media, animation, and 3D printing. Johnston has exhibited and screened his work widely in the international Lumen Prize Exhibition, World Maker Faire New York 2012, Los Angeles Center for Digital Art (DigitalArt.LA 2010), the Philoctetes Center, New York, NY (The Matter of Time 2010); the Tank Space for Performing and Visual Arts, New York, NY   (ArcheTime 2009); Video Art Festival Miden 2009, Kalamata, Greece; the Best of Artomatic 2009 at the Fraser Gallery, Bethesda, MD; PLAY Gallery on Michigan Television; the Emmanuel Gallery, Denver, Colorado (Substance 2007); and the Cothenius Gallery, Berlin, Germany (In Circulation 2006). His work has been included and reviewed in magazine articles, online newspapers, catalogues for exhibitions, and other publications.

Education and Teaching 
Edward Johnston was born in Washington, D.C. He received a Master of Fine Arts degree from the University of Michigan School of Art & Design, a Master of Education degree from the University of Notre Dame, and a Post-baccalaureate Certificate in Fine Art from the Maryland Institute College of Art. Johnston teaches at the Robert Busch School of Design at Kean University. He has taught at Monmouth University, the University of Michigan, PGCC, and the Capitol Hill Arts Workshop (CHAW).

Fellowships, Honors, Awards and Grants 
 2013 Augmented Asbury Park project selected for Creative Capital's On Our Radar website (online until 9/30/2013)
 2012 Work selected for the Lumen Prize Exhibition 50
 2011 Grant-in-Aid for Creativity, Monmouth University
 2010 Trailblazer Grant, PGCC Teaching-Learning Center
 2009 YAP Grant, D.C. Commission on the Arts and Humanities, partly funded by the National Endowment for the Arts
 2009 YAP Supplemental Grant, D.C. Commission on the Arts and Humanities, partly funded by the National Endowment for the Arts
 2009 Best of Artomatic – Work selected from over 1000 artists at Artomatic 2009, Washington, D.C.; included in "Best of Artomatic" Fraser Gallery, Bethesda, MD
 2008 Honorarium, Krasl Art Center, St. Joseph, MI
 2008 Research Grant, Rackham School of Graduate Studies, University of Michigan, Ann Arbor, MI
 2007 Honorarium, Big Ten Conference, Park Ridge, IL
 2007 Harold and Vivian Shapiro/John Malik Award, Rackham School of Graduate Studies, University of Michigan, Ann Arbor, MI
 2005–08 Jean Paul Slusser Fellowships, University of Michigan School of Art & Design, Ann Arbor, MI

References

External links 
 Artist Website

Living people
American digital artists
New media artists
American animators
American multimedia artists
Kean University faculty
Artists from Washington, D.C.
Maryland Institute College of Art alumni
University of Notre Dame alumni
Penny W. Stamps School of Art & Design alumni
Year of birth missing (living people)